Millwood Lake is a reservoir in southwestern Arkansas, United States.

Statistics 
Lake statistics:

Drainage area above the dam: 
Elevation above sea level of the top of flood control pool: 
Elevation above sea level of the top of conservation pool: 
Elevation above sea level of the top of inactive pool: 
Surface area of lake at top of flood control pool: 
Surface area of lake at top of conservation pool: 
Shoreline length at top of conservation pool: 

Dam statistics:

Length of dam: 
Maximum height of dam above streambed: 
Length of spillway: 
Length of non-overflow section: 
Spillway crest gates (13), size: 
Outlet conduits (2), size: 
Water supply pipe (1), diameter:

Overview 
Lake Millwood is mainly recognized for its beauty and fishing. There are 15 recreational parks around the lake to provide campers with picnic areas, boat ramps, swimming areas, showers, and restrooms. Its  of submerged timber provide homes for the many varieties of fish in the lake, including the indigenous Millwood lunker largemouth bass. Other species of fauna around the lake include white-tailed deer, bobwhite quail, squirrel, dove, rabbit, raccoon, armadillo, opossum, fox, mink, American gator and beaver. Boating is also popular on Millwood Lake, but only a small part of the whole surface area of the lake can be used as boating due to the submerged timber that takes up  of the pond. Lake Millwood also has a diverse flora life, with many plants and trees such as; gum, oak, birch, pine, juniper, flowering shrubs, and wildflowers.

History 
The Millwood Lake project was authorized by the Flood Control Act of 1946, and modified by the Flood Control Act of 1958. The dam and lake were designed and built by the Tulsa District of the Army Corps of Engineers
, which still maintains the lake's Beard's Bluff recreation center. The projects construction work began in 1961, and was finished for flood control operations in 1966 at a cost of $44,000,000. The lake and dam were dedicated on December 8, 1966. The lake is the key in the general flood reduction system for the Red River below Lake Texoma.

Water use 
Benefits of the lake have been restoring wildlife, providing water to nearby areas, and preventing an estimate of $9,715,000 in flood damage. In Ashdown, Arkansas, the lake supplies Domtar's (formerly Georgia Pacific) Communications Paper Division with 50 million gallons of water each day for its operations.  The lake also provides drinking water to the city of Texarkana, Arkansas, through a water treatment plant located at Ashdown.

See also 
List of Arkansas dams and reservoirs

References

External links

Bathymetric Map, Area/Capacity Table, and Sediment Volume Estimate for Millwood Lake, Near Ashburn, Arkansas, 2013 United States Geological Survey
Fishing Millwood Lake Black Bass, Crappie and Catfish

Reservoirs in Arkansas
Protected areas of Little River County, Arkansas
Protected areas of Hempstead County, Arkansas
Protected areas of Howard County, Arkansas
Protected areas of Sevier County, Arkansas
Buildings and structures in Hempstead County, Arkansas
Buildings and structures in Howard County, Arkansas
Buildings and structures in Sevier County, Arkansas
Buildings and structures in Little River County, Arkansas
Dams in Arkansas
United States Army Corps of Engineers dams
Dams completed in 1966
Bodies of water of Hempstead County, Arkansas
Bodies of water of Howard County, Arkansas
Bodies of water of Little River County, Arkansas
Bodies of water of Sevier County, Arkansas